China Hong Kong City is a commercial complex that includes five office towers, a shopping centre, a hotel and a ferry terminal in Tsim Sha Tsui, Kowloon, Hong Kong. The complex opened in 1988 on land formerly occupied in part by the Royal Naval Dockyard (subsequently Government Dockyard) and the Sea Terminus (demolished 1969). It is situated along Canton Road, next to The Gateway and the Tsim Sha Tsui Fire Station. The complex is managed by the Sino Group.

According to its Chinese website, it is the largest building in the world with a gold-coloured facade.

Hotel
The Royal Pacific Hotel & Towers, managed by Sino Hotels, is part of the complex.

Transportation hub
Below the shopping centre is a bus terminus. The China Ferry Terminal, extended from The Royal Pacific Hotel, provides ferry services to destinations in mainland China and Macau.

References

External links

 Official website

Tsim Sha Tsui
Shopping centres in Hong Kong
Office buildings in Hong Kong
Hotels in Hong Kong
Sino Group